Fingal is a county in Ireland, formerly the northern part of the historical county of Dublin. Fingal may also refer to:

Arts
 Fingal (hero), the eponymous hero of a poem in the Ossian cycle by James Macpherson
 Fingal (music group), Irish traditional music group

Places

Australia
 Fingal, Tasmania, Australian town
 Fingal, Victoria, Australian town 
 Fingal Head, New South Wales, Australian village, often referred to as Fingal

Elsewhere 
 Fingal, North Dakota, U.S. town
 Fingal, Ontario, community in Canada near a Royal Canadian Air Force station

Sport
 Fingal county hurling team
 Sporting Fingal F.C., association football club in the Football League of Ireland

Other uses
 Fingal mac Gofraid, late 11th century King of the Isles
 MV Fingal, former Northern Lighthouse Board ship converted into a boutique hotel, berthed in Edinburgh, Scotland
 SS Fingal, Norwegian merchant ship sunk off Australia in World War II

See also 
 Fingal Bay, New South Wales, near Port Stephens in Australia
 Fingal's Cave, sea-cave on Staffa in the Inner Hebrides of Scotland
 Finghall, village in North Yorkshire, England
 Irish place names in other countries